Sweet Heart Dealer is the debut studio album by the rock band Scarling., released on February 17, 2004, through Sympathy For The Record Industry.  Originally scheduled for release as Butcherbourne, the album was retitled at the last minute, and pared down from 11 tracks to seven during mixing at Old Blue Studios in Los Angeles. The songs "A Constant Reminder", "Surgeon General", "Here On Earth" and "Funeral Gown" were recorded then omitted and have yet to be released.

Robert Smith of The Cure described Scarling's music as "dark, desperate, chaotic, gorgeous pop music, the sound of the end of the world."

Track listing
All songs written by Jessicka and Christian Hejnal.
 "The Last Day I Was Happy" – 3:49
 "Band Aid Covers the Bullet Hole" – 3:26
 "Crispin Glover" – 3:18
 "Alexander the Burn Victim" – 6:00
 "Baby Dracula" – 3:54
 "Black Horse Riding Star" – 5:31
 "Can't (Halloween Valentine)" – 7:21

LP Track listing

Side A
 "The Last Day I Was Happy" – 3:49
 "Crispin Glover" – 3:18
 "Band Aid Covers the Bullet Hole" – 3:26
 "Baby Dracula" – 3:54
 "Love Becomes a Ghost" (LP bonus track)

Side B
 "Black Horse Riding Star" – 5:31
 "Alexander the Burn Victim" – 6:00
 "Can't (Halloween Valentine)" – 7:21

 Note: the LP sleeve incorrectly transposes the songs "Alexander the Burn Victim" and "Baby Dracula"

Personnel
Credits are adapted from the album's liner notes.
Jessicka — vocals, additional art
Christian Hejnal — guitar, bass
Rickey Lime — guitar
Garey Snider — drums
Bobby Hidalgo — additional bass
Chris Vrenna — producer
Erik Colvin — mixing
Logan Mader — engineer
John Vestman — mastering
Leslie Ann Sundoll — art direction
Piper Ferguson — photography
Mark Ryden — cover art

Charts and awards
Nominee, 2004 Shortlist Music Prize

Notes

References

Scarling. albums
2004 debut albums
Albums produced by Chris Vrenna
Sympathy for the Record Industry albums